Ásthildur Helgadóttir (born 9 May 1976) is an Icelandic former footballer who played club football in America and Sweden, as well as her native Iceland. From 1993 until her retirement in 2007 she represented the senior Iceland women's national football team, winning 69 caps and scoring 23 goals. She is the elder sister of Iceland national team goalkeeper Þóra Björg Helgadóttir.

References

External links

1976 births
Living people
Asthildur Helgadottir
Asthildur Helgadottir
FC Rosengård players
Damallsvenskan players
USL W-League (1995–2015) players
Carolina Courage players
Expatriate women's footballers in Sweden
Expatriate women's soccer players in the United States
Asthildur Helgadottir
Vanderbilt Commodores women's soccer players
Asthildur Helgadottir
Women's association football midfielders
Women's association football forwards
Asthildur Helgadottir
Icelandic expatriate sportspeople in the United States
Boston Renegades players